Nelson Adrián Peña Robaina (born 20 January 1976) is a Uruguayan businessman and politician of the Colorado Party. He served as the first Minister of the Environment from August 27, 2020 to January 30, 2023.

He has been in politics since he was 13 years old, but it was only in 2009 that he decided to head a political project in his department. A native of the town of San Bautista, Peña is dedicated to the business of raising and distributing poultry.

Early life and education 
Peña is from San Bautista. He started his career in the Poultry industry.

Political career 
In 1994, he began his political career attached to Lista 15 de Canelones, in support of Jorge Batlle. In the 2004 election, he supported the candidacy for the presidency of Guillermo Stirling, and in 2008 he joined the "Batllismo Unido" faction of the Department of Canelones and "Vamos Uruguay".

In 2009 he was elected National and Departmental Conventional in the presidential primaries. That year he was also elected a member of the Departmental Executive Committee of the Colorado Party in Canelones. In August 2009, he joined a new political group, with the aim of renewing the Colorado Party in Canelones. In October, he was a candidate for National Representative for List 11, supporting Pedro Bordaberry's candidacy for the Senate.

In the 2014 presidential primaries, his political group was the winner within the Colorado Party. In the general election, he was elected National Representative for Canelones, for the 48th Legislature. In November 2014 he was unanimously elected General Secretary of the Colorado Party in Canelones and in December 2014, he was elected a titular member of the National Executive Committee of the Colorado Party.

On May 31, 2017, he was elected General Secretary of the Colorado Party. In 2018 he founded, together with the Economist Ernesto Talvi, "Ciudadanos" political group within the PC. In the 2019 general election, he supported Talvi's candidacy for President of the Republic. In it, he was elected Senator.

Minister of Environment 
On July 18, 2020, his appointment as the first Minister of the Environment was confirmed, when the portfolio was separated from the Ministry of Housing and Territorial Planning. He took office on August 27 in Aguas Corrientes.

In a January 2021 interview, he described GMO crops and sustainable agriculture as priorities, alongside improving drinking water quality and water management.

Source:

He resigned as the Minister of Environment on January 30, 2023 after it was discovered he lied about his title in Business Administration.

References

External links 

 Andrés Peña's virtual office

Colorado Party (Uruguay) politicians
Uruguayan businesspeople
1976 births
Living people